The Ministry of Citizenship, Immigration and International Trade was a ministry of the Government of Ontario that was responsible for citizenship, immigration and international trade issues in the Canadian province of Ontario. The ministry existed from 2014 to 2016, with Michael Chan as the Minister of Citizenship, Immigration and International Trade. 

The ministry's predecessor and successor for citizenship and immigration issues was known as the Ministry of Citizenship and Immigration. For international trade issues, the ministry's predecessor was the Ministry of Economic Development, Trade and Employment, and its successor was the Ministry of International Trade.

See also
 Ministry of Citizenship and Multiculturalism, the superseding and current ministry reintroduced in 2021
Citizenship and Immigration Canada
 Immigration to Canada

References

2003 establishments in Ontario
Immigration to Canada
Ontario
Ministries established in 2003
Citizenship and Immigration
Immigration to Ontario
Defunct migration-related organizations based in Canada